Pedro Gamboni (September 26, 1825 - December 27, 1895) was a Chilean chemical engineer who did important studies related to saltpeter and iodine in the regions of Tarapaca and Antofagasta.Gamboni invented a new method to extract nitrate from caliche leading to the phasing out of the older firewood and labour intensive paradas method in the 1850s.

References

1825 births
1895 deaths
Chilean chemical engineers
Saltpeter works in Chile
Chilean inventors